The Euthanasia Laws Act 1997 (Cth) was an Act of the Parliament of Australia to amend the Northern Territory (Self-Government) Act 1978, the Australian Capital Territory (Self-Government) Act 1988 and the Norfolk Island Act 1979 to remove the power of the Parliament of each of those territories to legalise euthanasia. The law was enacted in response to the enactment of the Rights of the Terminally Ill Act 1995 (NT) by the Parliament of the Northern Territory which had legalised euthanasia in the Territory. The Act was repealed by the Restoring Territory Rights Act 2022, which was passed by the federal parliament in December 2022.

Background 
The Euthanasia Laws Bill 1996 was introduced in the Australian Parliament by Liberal Party backbencher Kevin Andrews as a private member's bill.

The Act 
Despite the power to legislate for euthanasia being held by the states, under Section 122 of the Constitution of Australia the Federal Parliament has the power to override any law passed by a territory parliament. This occurred in 1997, when the Federal Parliament passed the Euthanasia Laws Act 1997, originally introduced as a private member's bill by Liberal MP Kevin Andrews. The legislation passed the Senate by 38 votes to 33 in March 1997, having previously passed the House of Representatives by 88 votes to 35 in December 1996. The law amended the Northern Territory (Self-Government) Act 1978 and Australian Capital Territory (Self-Government) Act 1988 to explicitly prevent the Northern Territory Parliament and Australian Capital Territory Legislative Assembly from legislating to allow euthanasia or assisted suicide. An identical ban was placed into the Norfolk Island Act 1979, which was later repealed as part of the abolition of self-government on Norfolk Island by the Abbott Government in 2015. As well as removing the power of those territories to legalise euthanasia, the Act specifically repealed the provisions of the Rights of the Terminally Ill Act 1995 (NT), which had previously been passed by the Northern Territory Parliament and allowed euthanasia to occur in the territory in the intervening period.

Legacy 
Over the following 20 years there were nine bills introduced to the parliament to repeal Andrews' legislation, though at no point did any repeal legislation come to a vote on the floor of either chamber of parliament. In 2018 Liberal Democratic Party Senator David Leyonhjelm re-introduced a bill into the Senate to remove the federal ban on the ACT and Northern Territory legislating for euthanasia. Leyonhjelm's bill was given priority in the Senate after he secured the Turnbull Government's agreement for a conscience vote in the Senate and possibly the House of Representatives (the question of the government permitting a vote in the House was unresolved), in exchange for his support to reinstate the Australian Building and Construction Commission. The Liberal/National Government, opposition Labor Party and several minor party crossbenchers held a conscience vote on the legislation. Despite Leyonhjelm expressing optimism for the bill's prospects, it was defeated in the Senate by 36 votes to 34.

The Euthanasia Laws Act remained in effect, even as all six state parliaments passed their own versions of assisted dying legislation between 2017 and 2022. The former Morrison Government rejected requests by the Australian Capital Territory (ACT) and Northern Territory governments to repeal the law. The Albanese Government, elected in May 2022, endorsed a conscience vote on repeal legislation that was introduced by Labor MPs Luke Gosling and Alicia Payne on 1 August 2022. The bill, titled the Restoring Territory Rights Bill 2022, removed the sections of the federal self-government acts for the ACT and Northern Territory that prevented those legislatures from passing euthanasia laws. It did not restore the Northern Territory's euthanasia law that was nullified by the federal parliament in 1997. Debate of the bill was prioritised by the government, and was approved by 99 votes to 37 in the House of Representatives on 3 August 2022. The bill passed its second reading in the Senate on 24 November 2022 by 41 votes to 25. It passed its third reading in the Senate on 1 December 2022, with no division called. The legislation received royal assent on 13 December 2022 and took immediate effect.

Notes

References

Acts of the Parliament of Australia
1997 in Australian law
Euthanasia legislation
Euthanasia in Australia